This page shows the results of the Men's Judo Competition at the 1963 Pan American Games, held from April 20 to May 5, 1963, in São Paulo, Brazil. There were a total number of four weight divisions. Judo made its first appearance at the Pan American Games. Just men were competing.

Men's competition

Men's Lightweight (-70 kg)

Men's Middleweight (-80 kg)

Men's Heavyweight (-90 kg)

Men's Open

Medal table

References
 Sports 123

1963
1963 Pan American Games
American Games
Judo competitions in Brazil
International sports competitions in São Paulo